The Podeus was a German automobile manufactured from 1911 to 1914; the works at Wismar produced two models, both fours: a 2248cc and a 2536cc sv.

References
David Burgess Wise, The New Illustrated Encyclopedia of Automobiles.

Defunct motor vehicle manufacturers of Germany